Harry Ebert Van Buren (December 6, 1924 – June 14, 2019) was an American football fullback and halfback who played in the National Football League (NFL), He was drafted by the Philadelphia Eagles in 1951 and played in the 1951 through 1953 seasons. He went to Louisiana State University. He was the brother of Steve Van Buren, with whom he played during the 1951 season with the Eagles. Van Buren was inducted into the LSU Athletic Hall of Fame in 2015 and died in June 2019 at the age of 94.

References

1924 births
2019 deaths
American football defensive backs
American football fullbacks
American football halfbacks
American football linebackers
Honduran players of American football
Honduran people of American descent
LSU Tigers football players
People from Tela
Philadelphia Eagles players